Malabar Rite may refer to:
 the liturgical rite of the Syro-Malabar Catholic Church
 the South Indian customs, conventionally called Malabar rites, that 17th-century Jesuit missionaries allowed their converts to maintain